Fumian District is a district of the prefecture-level city of Yulin in Guangxi Zhuang Autonomous Region, China. It is the largest base for clothing manufacturing in Guangxi, and claims to be the "trousers capital of the world". In 2010 its total GDP was 4.56 billion yuan.

Administrative divisions
Fumian District is divided into six towns, which are further divided into 116 administrative villages:
Fumian
Chengjun
Zhangmu
Xinqiao
Shatian
Shihe

References

County-level divisions of Guangxi
Yulin, Guangxi